The 1946–47 season was Chelsea Football Club's thirty-third competitive season. The season marked the resumption of the Football League, which had been suspended since 1939 due to the Second World War. £14,000 signing Tommy Lawton scored a then-club record 26 league goals, but was unable to help the team to success, as they finished 15th in the First Division.

Table

References

External links
 1946–47 season at stamford-bridge.com

1946–47
English football clubs 1946–47 season